The Decatur Heights Historic District is a national historic district in Cumberland, Allegany County, Maryland. It is a mixed-use district of  located on the northeast side of Cumberland. It contains a total of 377 residential / commercial / industrial historic resources, including five properties previously listed on the National Register of Historic Places. Approximately 50 percent of the resources in the district predate 1890, approximately 40 percent date were constructed between 1890 and 1930, and the remaining approximately 10 percent post-date 1930. It is significant because: 1) its association with the history of African-American education in Cumberland; 2) its association with the exploration and settlement of the region, with its location along the National Road; and 3) the dense concentration of primarily residential buildings built between about 1820 and the 1940s.

It was listed on the National Register of Historic Places in 2005.

References

External links
, including photo in 2004, at Maryland Historical Trust
Boundary Map of the Decatur Heights Historic District, Allegany County, at Maryland Historical Trust

African-American history in Appalachia
African-American history of Maryland
Cumberland, Maryland
Historic districts in Allegany County, Maryland
Historic districts on the National Register of Historic Places in Maryland
National Register of Historic Places in Allegany County, Maryland